The Photon Factory (PF) is a synchrotron located at KEK, in Tsukuba, Japan, about fifty kilometres from Tokyo.

There are two major facilities, the Photon Factory itself which is a 2.5GeV synchrotron with a beam current of around 450mA, and the PF-AR 'Advanced Ring for Pulsed X-Rays', which is a 6.5GeV machine running in a single-bunch mode with a beam current of around 60mA.

Its macromolecular crystallography beamline is used substantially for Japan's structural genomics project.

External links
Photon Factory - KEK IMSS website

Synchrotron radiation facilities